The Sony Vaio A series was a range of multimedia notebook computers from Sony introduced in May 2004, featuring a 17" 16:10 widescreen LCD screen with 1920x1200 resolution. It was replaced by the AX series.

All models used the Intel Pentium M processor, initially at 1.7 GHz, featuring integrated wireless, modem and ethernet, 64 MB ATI Mobility 9700 graphics and a DVD burner.

The A weighed 8.6 pounds (3.9 kg).

External links 

A